Mike Lewis (born July 14, 1949) is a former defensive lineman who played ten seasons in the National Football League (Falcons, Packers).  He currently resides in Houston, TX and is enjoying the retired life.

External links
Pro-Football-Reference stats
NFL stats

1949 births
Living people
Players of American football from Houston
American football defensive tackles
Arkansas–Pine Bluff Golden Lions football players
Atlanta Falcons players
Green Bay Packers players